Imaginary Life is the debut full-length studio album by Worriers. The album was produced by Laura Jane Grace.

Track listing
All songs written by Lauren Denitzio

Personnel 
 Lauren Denitzio – vocals, guitar
 John McLean - guitar
 Rachel Rubino - guitar
 Audrey Zee Whitesides - bass
 Mike Yannich - drums, backing vocals
 Lou Hanman - backing vocals

References

2015 debut albums
Worriers (band) albums
Don Giovanni Records albums